Melaleuca ciliosa is a small shrub in the myrtle family, Myrtaceae and is endemic to the south-west of Western Australia. It has bright or pale yellow flowers, an unusual calyx and leaves that are slightly hairy, especially around the edges.

Description 
The edges of the leaves are distinctly hairy, there are a few soft hairs on the surface and many prominent oil glands.

The flowers are white or pale yellow and arranged in heads or spikes at or near the ends of the branches which continue to grow after flowering. The petals fall off as the flower opens and the stamens are joined in five bundles around the edge of the flower, each bundle containing 5 to 11 stamens. Flowering usually occurs in October and November.

Taxonomy and naming
This species was first formally described in 1862 by the Russian botanist Nikolai Turczaninow in Bulletin de la Société Impériale des Naturalistes de Moscou. The specific epithet (ciliosa) is from a Latin word cilium meaning "fine hair", referring to the hairs on the edges of the leaves of this species.

Distribution and habitat
This melaleuca occurs in sand heath between Geraldton and Perth in the Avon Wheatbelt, Geraldton Sandplains, Jarrah Forest and Swan Coastal Plain biogeographic regions. It grows in sand with lateritic gravel in uplands.

Conservation status
Melaleuca ciliosa is listed as "not threatened" by the Government of Western Australia Department of Parks and Wildlife.

Use in horticulture
This species adapts to a wide range of soils and conditions but prefers a well-drained soil in a sunny position. Regular pruning help to keep the shrub compact.

References

ciliosa
Myrtales of Australia
Plants described in 1862
Rosids of Western Australia
Endemic flora of Western Australia
Taxa named by Nikolai Turczaninow